Collaria is a genus of plant bugs in the family Miridae. There are at least 3 described species in Collaria.

Species
 Collaria meilleurii Provancher, 1872
 Collaria oculata (Reuter, 1876)
 Collaria oleosa (Distant, 1883)

References

 Thomas J. Henry, Richard C. Froeschner. (1988). Catalog of the Heteroptera, True Bugs of Canada and the Continental United States. Brill Academic Publishers.

Further reading

 

Miridae genera
Stenodemini